The Old Narragansett Cemetery is an historic cemetery on Shermantown Road in North Kingstown, Rhode Island. Variant names for the cemetery include Narragansett Cemetery, Platform Cemetery, and The Platform Cemetery. It was established early in the 18th century, and is one of North Kingstown's oldest and longest-used cemeteries. It has 110 marked graves, and was used from its establishment c. 1705 to the 1880s. The most prominent memorials are to James MacSparran and Samuel Fayerweather, two long-serving ministers at the Old Narragansett Church, which stood nearby when it was built in 1706.

The cemetery was added to the National Register of Historic Places in 1985.

See also
 National Register of Historic Places listings in Washington County, Rhode Island

References

External links
 

Cemeteries on the National Register of Historic Places in Rhode Island
Buildings and structures in North Kingstown, Rhode Island
National Register of Historic Places in Washington County, Rhode Island